The Pollen Baronetcy of Redenham, in the County of Southampton, is a title in the Baronetage of Great Britain. It was created on 15 May 1795 for John Pollen. The family descended from Edward Pollen (died 1636), a London merchant originally from Lincolnshire.

His son, John Pollen I, grandson, John Pollen II (c. 1642 – by November 1719), and great-grandson, John Pollen III (c. 1702 – 1775), all represented Andover in the House of Commons. The latter was the father of the first Baronet. The second Baronet also sat as Member of Parliament for this constituency 1820–21 and 1835–41. As of 13 June 2007 the presumed 8th and present Baronet has not successfully proved his succession and is therefore not on the Official Roll of the Baronetage.

Pollen baronets, of Redenham (1795)

Sir John Pollen, 1st Baronet (–1814)
John Walter Pollen, 2nd Baronet (1784–1863), MP for Andover 1820–1821 and 1835–1841, succeeded by nephew 
Sir Richard Hungerford Pollen, 3rd Baronet (1815–1881), whose younger brother John Hungerford Pollen was ancestor of the 7th Baronet, below.
Sir Richard Hungerford Pollen, 4th Baronet (1846–1918)
Sir Richard Pollen, 5th Baronet (1878–1930)
Sir John Lancelot Hungerford Pollen, 6th Baronet (1884–1959)
Sir John Michael Hungerford Pollen, 7th Baronet (1919–2003), succeeded by only son
Richard John Hungerford Pollen, 8th Baronet (born 1946)
The heir apparent to the baronetcy is William Richard Hungerford Pollen (born 1976). The heir-in-line is William Pollen's only son, Zach William Hungerford Pollen (born 2010).

Descendants
John Hungerford Pollen (senior) (1820–1902), Catholic convert and father of ten children including eight sons
John Hungerford Pollen (Jesuit) (1858–1925), eldest son of above (his next brother's grandson became 7th Baronet).
Arthur Pollen (1866–1937) inventor, 6th son of the first John Hungerford Pollen
Clare Asquith (born 1951), scholar, great-granddaughter of above
Arabella Pollen (born 1961) knitwear designer, now novelist, granddaughter of Sir Walter Michael Hungerford Pollen, and great-granddaughter of Robert Henry Benson, art collector (died 1929).

Notes

References
Kidd, Charles, Williamson, David (editors). Debrett's Peerage and Baronetage (1990 edition). New York: St Martin's Press, 1990.

Pollen
1795 establishments in Great Britain